Nikolay Borislavov Gergov (born March 17, 1978, in Oryahovo, Vratsa) is an amateur Bulgarian Greco-Roman wrestler, who played for the men's welterweight category. He defeated South Korea's Kim Min-Chul for a gold medal in the 66 kg division at the 2005 World Wrestling Championships in Budapest, Hungary, in addition to his bronze from the 2007 World Wrestling Championships in Baku, Azerbaijan. He is also a two-time Olympian, a double European wrestling champion, and a member of Slavia Litex Wrestling Club in Sofia, under his personal coach Bratan Tzenov. Because of his further successes in wrestling, Gergov was selected as one of eleven athletes for the Bulgarian Sports Personality Award in 2007.

Gergov made his official debut for the 2004 Summer Olympics in Athens, where he placed second in the preliminary pool of the men's 66 kg class, against South Korea's Kim In-Sub and Hungary's Levente Füredy.

At the 2008 Summer Olympics in Beijing, Gergov competed for the second time in the men's 66 kg class. He defeated Turkey's Şeref Eroğlu, and Russia's Sergey Kovalenko in the preliminary rounds, before losing out the semi-final match to Kyrgyzstan's Kanatbek Begaliev, with a classification point score of 1–3. Because his opponent advanced further into the final match, Gergov automatically qualified for the bronze medal bout, where he was defeated by Ukraine's Armen Vardanyan, with a three-set technical score (4–1, 1–2, 6–1), and a classification point score of 1–3.

References

External links
Profile – International Wrestling Database
NBC 2008 Olympics profile

1978 births
Living people
People from Oryahovo
Bulgarian male sport wrestlers
Olympic wrestlers of Bulgaria
Wrestlers at the 2004 Summer Olympics
Wrestlers at the 2008 Summer Olympics
World Wrestling Championships medalists
20th-century Bulgarian people
21st-century Bulgarian people